Keith Edward Crouch is an American songwriter and music producer. Crouch began his career as a songwriter at the age of fifteen and landed his first gig at seventeen. From 1993 to 1994, Crouch produced six songs for Brandy's self-titled debut album, three of which became top ten hits. He has produced for artists such as Toni Braxton, Mary J. Blige, Boyz II Men, Chaka Khan and Misia.

Crouch won two GMA Dove Awards in 2000 for Contemporary Gospel trio Anointed's self-titled album.

Select songwriting and production discography

References

External links

Keith Crouch at Discogs

Living people
Year of birth missing (living people)
Record producers from California
Songwriters from California

American songwriters